The Wedding at Cana is a story in the bible.

Wedding at Cana, or similar, may also refer to:
 
 The Marriage Feast at Cana (Bosch), painting by or after Hieronymus Bosch, after 1550
 Wedding at Cana (Damaskinos), a painting by Michael Damaskinos, c. 1560–1570
 The Marriage at Cana (Gerard David), a painting by Gerard David, c. 1500–1510
 The Wedding at Cana, a painting by Paolo Veronese, 1563

See also
Water into Wine (disambiguation)